"Falling to Pieces" was the first single by Greek power metal band Firewind, released on 13 June 2006 through Century Media Records. The music video was directed by Patric Ullaeus and the song peaked at #11 in the Greek Singles Chart.
The song Falling to Pieces is also featured on the metal album "Metal for the Masses".

Track listing
"Falling to Pieces" – 3:20 
"Teenage Idol" – 4:28 
"Demon Nights" – 4:23

Personnel
 Apollo Papathanasio – vocals
 Gus G. – guitars
 Babis Katsionis – keyboards
 Petros Christodoylidis – bass
 Mark Cross – drums

Footnotes

Firewind songs
2006 singles
2006 songs
Music videos directed by Patric Ullaeus